...So, Were They in Some Sort of Fight? is the last release by A Minor Forest, released on Oct 5, 1999, by the My Pal God label.

Track listing

Personnel 

A.M.F. – Engineer
Matt Anderson – Engineer
John Benson – Bass, Clarinet, Guitar, Vocals, Music Box
Loren Chasse – Remixing
Andee Connors – Bass, Drums, Vocals, Slide Guitar
Dominique Davison – Cello
Andy Ernst – Mixing
David Franklin – Photography
Erik Hoversten – Bass, Guitar, Vocals, Guitorgan
Little River Band – Engineer
Keif San Augustin – Assistant Engineer
Kurt Schlegel – Engineer
Bart Thurber – Engineer, Mixing
Uncle Tupelo – Engineer

External links
 Allmusic  link

A Minor Forest compilation albums
1999 compilation albums
My Pal God Records compilation albums